Sun Hung Kai & Co. Limited （ is an alternative investment company headquartered in Hong Kong. Since its establishment in 1969, the Group has owned and operated market-leading platforms in Financial Services. The Group invests across public markets, alternatives and real assets and has an established track record of generating long-term risk adjusted returns for its shareholders. Most recently, it has extended its strategy to incubate, accelerate and support emerging asset managers in the Asian region. It is also the major shareholder of a leading Consumer Finance firm, United Asia Finance Limited. The Group currently holds about HK$48.8 billion in total assets as at 31 December 2021.

Sun Hung Kai & Co. and Sun Hung Kai Properties carry the common name “Sun Hung Kai”, which reflects a shared heritage. Yet they are two different entities with totally separate shareholders and management. The company is controlled by Lee Seng Huang, the Group Executive Chairman.

History
Sun Hung Kai & Co. was established in 1969 by Fung King Hey, Kwok Tak Seng and Lee Shau Kee. It was listed on the Hong Kong stock exchange in 1983. In 1996, the company was acquired from the Fung family by Allied Properties (HK) Limited, a subsidiary of Allied Group Limited, an investment holding company which manages property investment and provides financial services.  In 2006, Sun Hung Kai & Co. Limited entered the consumer finance business by acquiring UAF Holdings Limited.

In 2015, Sun Hung Kai & Co. sold its subsidiary Sun Hung Kai Financial to Everbright Securities, developed Mortgage business with the establishment of Sun Hung Kai Credit Limited, built Investment Management platform which becomes another major profit contributor for the Company. 

From 2020, Sun Hung Kai & Co. extended the Investment Management business into Funds Management Platform. It has committed and launched four partnerships (East Point Asset Management, E15VC, ActusRayPartners and MCIP) in 1H2021.

References

Link
 

Companies listed on the Hong Kong Stock Exchange
Financial services companies established in 1969
Investment banks in Hong Kong
1969 establishments in Hong Kong